Venus Returning is the debut studio album by Australian pop band The Mavis's, released in May 1996 by record label Mushroom. It was produced by Kalju Tonuma (Nick Barker). Australian musicologist, Ian McFarlane, described how it "highlighted the band's brash sound, which mixed the Thomas siblings' idiosyncratic, imperfect vocal blend, crashing guitars, sugar-frosted melodies, goofy keyboard embellishments and odd instrumentation (sitar, Tibetan bells and Indian banjo)." The album provided three singles, "Thunder" (March 1996), "Box" (June) and "Lost" (November). "Thunder" was listed on the national youth radio Triple J audience poll, Hottest 100 of 1996, at No. 92.  The album peaked at No. 76 on the Australian ARIA Albums Chart.

Track listing 

 "Moon Drone Gold" – 3:10
 "Thunder" – 3:32
 "Box" – 3:59
 "Giant" – 3:32
 "Do You Have a Brother?" – 2:54
 "Supa*Star" – 3:28
 "See-Saw" – 3:06
 "The Land That Time Forgot" – 2:59
 "Sleep" – 2:51
 "Lost" – 3:55
 "Ribcage" – 3:53
 "Ghosts of the Night" – 3:09

Charts

References 

1996 debut albums
The Mavis's albums
Mushroom Records albums